Seberg is a 2019 political thriller film directed by Benedict Andrews, from a screenplay by Joe Shrapnel and Anna Waterhouse based on the life of Jean Seberg. It stars Kristen Stewart, Jack O'Connell, Margaret Qualley, Zazie Beetz, Anthony Mackie, and Vince Vaughn.

It had its world premiere at the Venice Film Festival on August 30, 2019. It was released in the United Kingdom on January 10, 2020, by Universal Pictures and in North America on February 21, 2020, by Amazon Studios, after an awards-qualifying run on December 13, 2019.

Plot
Jean Seberg, an American actress known for playing the female lead in Jean-Luc Godard's film Breathless, prepares to part with her husband, Romain Gary, and child in Paris before leaving for Los Angeles. On the jet flight in first class, she witnesses a Black activist insisting on sitting in first class and offering to pay for the seats. The activist demands preferential treatment for Malcolm X's widow, claiming she should be treated like "royalty"; Seberg appears to be attracted to the passenger, who introduces himself as Hakim Jamal, a member of the Black Panther Party (BPP).

Upon arrival in the U.S., Seberg notices a group of Black activists protesting at the airport and indicating their displeasure with the treatment Jamal and his traveling companions received on the flight. She joins the protesters and raises her fist in a Black power salute in solidarity. Unbeknownst to her, FBI agents, including Jack Solomon, are undercover at the airport. At Solomon's suggestion, the FBI shadow her activities while she is in the U.S. and arrange to have her phone conversations taped due to her perceived association with the Black Power movement.

After telling Jamal she knows the incident on the plane was staged to get her attention, Seberg begins a sexual relationship with him, despite the latter being married. The FBI's surveillance program COINTELPRO begins to target Seberg, recording her and Jamal having sex and playing it to Jamal's wife, Dorothy, over the phone. Jamal leaves Seberg after Dorothy confronts him, leaving Seberg devastated. Seberg becomes increasingly paranoid after suspecting that her life is being monitored. Solomon anonymously calls Seberg to warn her to sever her ties with the movement.

Seberg becomes pregnant by an unknown person. Continuing their surveillance and harassment of Seberg for years, COINTELPRO agents create a rumor that the baby was fathered by a member of the BPP and feed it to the media. Seberg attempts suicide, which leads to her daughter dying in infancy. The combination of her daughter's death and the FBI's smear campaign about the child's paternity send her into a deep depression. Seberg announces she would sue the publication that published the rumor. Solomon changes his mind about surveilling Seberg, takes the FBI file on her, and shows it to her at a bar, confirming her suspicions. After the encounter, the real-life Seberg is said to have moved back to Paris while still supporting the BPP and died in 1979 due to a probable suicide.

Cast

Production
In March 2018, it was announced Kristen Stewart, Jack O'Connell, Anthony Mackie, Margaret Qualley and Colm Meaney had joined the cast of the film, then titled Against All Enemies. Benedict Andrews will direct the film from a screenplay by Joe Shrapnel and Anna Waterhouse. Fred Berger, Brian Kavanaugh-Jones, Kate Garwood, Stephen Hopkins, Bradley Pilz, will produce the film under their Automatik and Bradley Pilz Productions banners, respectively. In April 2018, Zazie Beetz joined the cast of the film. In May 2018, Vince Vaughn, Yvan Attal and Stephen Root joined the cast of the film. In June 2018, Cornelius Smith Jr. and Jade Pettyjohn joined the cast of the film. In July 2018, Ser'Darius Blain joined the cast of the film.

Filming
Principal production started June 30, 2018 in Los Angeles. Production concluded on August 2, 2018.

Release
Amazon Studios acquired distribution rights to Against All Enemies in February 2019. The film was retitled Seberg, and had its world premiere out of competition at the Venice Film Festival on August 30, 2019. Universal Pictures distributed the film in select international territories outside of America. It also screened at the Toronto International Film Festival on September 7, 2019. The film was released in the United States on December 13, 2019, in an Oscar qualifying run, before being released on February 21, 2020. and in the United Kingdom on January 10, 2020.

Critical response
The site's critical consensus reads, "Sebergs frustratingly superficial treatment of a fascinating true story does a disservice to its subject—and Kristen Stewart's performance in the central role." On Metacritic, the film holds a weighted average score of 54 out of 100, based on 28 critics, indicating "mixed or average reviews".

Time's annual best performances of the year list by Stephanie Zacharek listed Stewart as the tenth best performance of 2019.

Accolades

References

External links
 
 
 

2019 films
American biographical films
British biographical films
American political thriller films
Films about the Federal Bureau of Investigation
Films shot in Los Angeles
Films set in Los Angeles
Biographical films about actors
Films about Hollywood, Los Angeles
Cultural depictions of actors
Amazon Studios films
Universal Pictures films
2010s biographical films
Films scored by Jed Kurzel
2010s English-language films
2010s American films
2010s British films